Illinka is a village in Ukraine, Odesa Raion, in Odesa Oblast. It belongs to Usatove rural hromada, one of the hromadas of Ukraine, and is one of the 15 villages in the hromada. It has a population of 1,291 people as of the 2001 census. The village was formed in the 19th century.

Until 18 July 2020, Illinka belonged to Biliaivka Raion. The raion was abolished in July 2020 as part of the administrative reform of Ukraine, which reduced the number of raions of Odesa Oblast to seven. The area of Biliaivka Raion was merged into Odesa Raion.

Population Census
On January 12, 1989, the population was 1,267; of whom 661 were female and 606 male.

On 2001, the population was 1,291.

References

Villages in Odesa Raion
Usatove Hromada